The Tatra 17 is a vintage automobile produced by the Czech manufacturer Tatra from 1925 until 1929. It was the company's top-end model which was sold alongside the economy car Tatra 12 and middle class Tatra 30.

Design

Engine
The block was made from silumin and cylinder heads from aluminium. It was the first Tatra with an ignition battery. Altogether 205 vehicles were made before 25 September 1926.

Another engine used was from the even more up-market Tatra 31.

Tatra 17/31 was for some time manufactured alongside the successor model Tatra 31, of which 300 vehicles were made.

Backbone tube
Model 17 was the first luxury Tatra with a backbone tube, which had been successfully used in the low cost type Tatra 11. Unlike model 11, the Tatra 17 had independent suspension not only of the rear half axles, but also of the front axles.

The car's driveshaft is inside the tube and the gear box and engine are mounted in the front of the tube, while the differential is in the rear.

Versions
Tatra 17 was a luxurious car for demanding clients. Many different versions were made, from a two-seater roadster to six-seater limousines.

There were also a few fire engines made. One of them remains in application as honorary fire engine of Svatý Jan nad Malší firefighters.

External links
Tatraportakl.sk - Tatra 17
Tatra 17/31 Fire engine video

17
Cars of the Czech Republic
Cars introduced in 1925
Automobiles with backbone chassis